Voskhod is a rural locality (a settlement) in Pleshkovsky Selsoviet, Zonalny District, Altai Krai, Russia. The population was 240 as of 2013. There are 5 streets.

Geography 
Voskhod is located 10 km north of Zonalnoye (the district's administrative centre) by road. Oktyabrsky is the nearest rural locality.

References 

Rural localities in Zonalny District